Disneyland Resort Pier is located at the south of the Hong Kong Disneyland Resort, Penny's Bay, Lantau Island, Hong Kong, with about 15-minute walking distance from Disneyland Resort station. It is a public pier for use by private vessels, yachts as well as tour vessels 24-hour free-of-charge.

It was planned to provide a ferry service between Central Piers and Disneyland Resort Pier. However, no ferry operators tendered for the service.

On 15 November 2016, Star Ferry announced that it has recently transformed a 27-year-old ferry "World Star" into an environmentally friendly tour boat, it will sail between Tsim Sha Tsui and Disneyland. The company hopes to attract more tourists to explore Hong Kong on the water. The company expects to break even in six years' time.

References

External websites
Star Ferry Water Tour

Year of establishment missing
Piers in Hong Kong
Hong Kong Disneyland Resort
Penny's Bay